Jackson station is a historic Amtrak station in Jackson, Michigan, United States. It is served by three daily  trains between Chicago and Pontiac and a single daily Amtrak Thruway bus between Toledo, Detroit, Jackson, and East Lansing. The station was added to the National Register of Historic Places in 2002.

History
What eventually became the Michigan Central Railroad was begun in 1837, and the track reached Jackson by 1841. By the 1870s, multiple other lines served the city including the  Jackson, Lansing and Saginaw Railroad, the Fort Wayne, Jackson and Saginaw Railroad, the Grand River Railway, and the Michigan Air Line Railroad. In 1872, the Michigan Central Railroad decided to construct a replacement for its earlier station built in 1841. The new station, named 'Jackson Union Station,' was used as a Union Station, serving all the other lines (namely, the Cincinnati Northern Railroad (1894–1938)) through Jackson except the Lake Shore and Michigan Southern Railway, which was then a major competitor with the Michigan Central, and the Grand Trunk Railway.  Construction began in late 1872, and finished in the summer of 1873.

Passenger service into Jackson remained high until the coming of the automobile. New York Central service along the Chicago-Detroit-Buffalo-New York New York Special and the Wolverine (operating on the same route) made stops at Jackson. Other routes were the Chicago-Toronto Canadian; the Chicago-Detroit Chicago Mercury; a Grand Rapids-Jackson train; and a Jackson-Lansing-Saginaw-Bay City train. Service to Bay City and Saginaw ended in 1959, and service to Toronto ended in 1961. In 1964, when I-94 was completed, ridership dropped dramatically. In 1971, Amtrak took over the Detroit-Chicago passenger service through Jackson, which remains the only current service in the station.

In 1978, the station underwent a refurbishing inspired by the nation's Bicentennial celebrations. Workers cleaned the brick exterior, reground the terazzo floors and refinished the elaborate wood trim and benches. Artist Leland Beamon created a mural showing the depot in 1904 alongside a modern Turboliner Amtrak train. Also in 1978, a former disgruntled New York Central employee named Rudy Bladel killed three former coworkers at the station. The murder trial led to a U.S. Supreme Court case, Michigan v. Jackson, on the admissibility of confessions. Additional improvements were made in 2008, 2013, and 2018.

Description

The Jackson Station consists of two buildings: the depot proper and nearby Express Building. The depot is a single story red brick Italianate structure, measuring about 325 feet in length and 44 feet in width. The building has two-story blocks measuring 23 feet by 45 feet extending from the roof at either end. The building sits on a foundation of light brownish sandstone with a whitish sandstone sillcourse running on top. The long walls are divided into sixteen bays by projecting brick piers; each bay contains a single window or door. The windows are narrow, tall six-over-six sash units with a three-light transom above, placed in an arched head opening with a five-piece segmental sandstone lintel above and a sandstone sill below. The building's ends each contain a double
doorway and a coupled window on the second story above. The flanking sections of the two-story blocks contain single second-floor windows.  

The building has a gable roof on the main section, with hipped roofs on the two-story blocks; the roofs are covered with modern asphalt shingles. The eaves have sheet metal cornices. On the track side, a wooden canopy runs along most of the building. The canopy is supported by cast iron columns.

The Express Building is a single-story L-shaped, brick building with a hip roof. It measures approximately 98 feet by 82 feet along the longest sides. It sits on a light brownish sandstone foundation. The elevations are divided into bays by brick piers, with each bay containing a freight door or window.

References

External links

Jackson station – USA Rail Guide (TrainWeb)
Union Station (Jackson, Michigan) (Michigan Internet Railroad History Museum)

Amtrak stations in Michigan
Former Michigan Central Railroad stations
Jackson, Michigan
Railway stations on the National Register of Historic Places in Michigan
Buildings and structures in Jackson County, Michigan
Transportation in Jackson County, Michigan
Italianate architecture in Michigan
Railway stations in the United States opened in 1873
1841 establishments in Michigan
National Register of Historic Places in Jackson County, Michigan
Michigan Line
Jackson, Michigan